The Court of Appeal of Newfoundland and Labrador is at the top of the hierarchy of courts for the Canadian province of Newfoundland and Labrador. The Court of Appeal derives its powers and jurisdiction from the Court of Appeal Act.

The independent Court of Appeal was established in 2018 and comprises the Chief Justice and five other justices. At any given time there may be one or more additional justices who sit as supernumerary justices. From 1975 until 2018 the Court of Appeal was constituted as the appeal division of the Supreme Court of Newfoundland and Labrador with judges appointed specifically to hear appeals from the General Division of the Supreme Court. Prior to 1975 both trial and appeals were carried out in the Supreme Court, where the individual judges routinely acted as a trial judges but, in the event of an appeal, would sit together (en banc) to hear it.

The Court now hears appeals of all type from the Supreme Court of Newfoundland and Labrador's General Division and Family Division, the Provincial Court, and a number of boards and tribunals. Decisions are subject to final appeal to the Supreme Court of Canada. Prior to 1949, when Newfoundland became a province of Canada, final appeals passed to the Judicial Committee of the Privy Council, which was the highest court for the British Empire and Commonwealth.  (For a list of Newfoundland decisions from the Judicial Committee, see:  List of Newfoundland Cases of the Judicial Committee of the Privy Council (pre-1949)).

Current members

Supernumerary

List of Chief Justices
Source (1791–1880):

Court of Civil Jurisdiction founded 1791  Supreme Court of Judicature of the Island of Newfoundland founded 1792  Supreme Court of Newfoundland founded 1824  Supreme Court of Newfoundland and Labrador Court of Appeal founded 1975.

See also
 Judicial appointments in Canada
 Provincial Court of Newfoundland and Labrador
 Supreme Court of Newfoundland and Labrador

References

External links 

 Official website

Newfoundland and Labrador
Newfoundland and Labrador courts
Judges in Newfoundland and Labrador
1975 establishments in Newfoundland and Labrador
Courts and tribunals established in 1975